The Super Bowl of Poker (also known as Amarillo Slim's Super Bowl of Poker or SBOP) was the second most prestigious poker tournament in the world during the 1980s.  While the World Series of Poker was already drawing larger crowds as more and more amateurs sought it out, the SBOP "was an affair limited almost exclusively to pros and hard-core amateurs."

Prior to 1979, the only high dollar tournament a person could enter was the WSOP.  1972 WSOP Main Event Champion and outspoken ambassador for poker Amarillo Slim saw this as an opportunity.  "The World Series of Poker was so successful that everybody wanted more than one tournament," he said.  Slim called upon his connections and friendships with poker's elite to start a new tournament in the February 1979.  Before the SBOP had developed a reputation of its own, many of the most respected names in poker attended the tournament "more to support Slim and take advantage of the very fat cash games the event would obviously inspire."  Slim modelled his SBOP after the WSOP with several events and a $10,000 Texas Hold'em Main Event.

One of the principal differences between the WSOP and the SBOP was the prize structure.  The WSOP's prize structure was flat ensuring more people received smaller pieces of the prize pool.  The SBOP typically used a 60-30-10 payout structure.  In other words, only the first three places received money and generally in the ratio of 60% to first place, 30% to second place, and 10% to third.  This payment schedule predominated the SBOP for the first 5 years of the event, but as the event grew the number of payouts increased while keeping the payout schedule top heavy.

1988 Tournament

The 1988 SBOP was possibly one of the most notable years in the tournament's history.  Two future Poker Hall of Famer's Stu Ungar and Jack Keller were playing heads-up for the right to claim the title.  Stu won the event and went on to become the only person to win three SBOP Main Events.  The loser, Jack Keller, ended up winning two SBOP Main Events.  The Main Event was not the only final table that Jack made it to in 1988.  Jack faced off against another future Poker Hall of Famer at the $1,000 Ace to Five Draw tournament.  This time he fell short to Chip Reese.

Key

Event 1: $ 10,000 No Limit Hold'em 

 Number of buy-ins: 42
 Total prize pool: $420,000
 Number of payouts: 7
 Reference:

Event 2: $ 500 Limit Hold'em

 Number of buy-ins: 156
 Total prize pool: $78,000
 Number of payouts: 8
 Reference:

Event 3: $ 1,000 Ace to Five Draw

 Number of buy-ins: 50
 Total prize pool: $50,000
 Number of payouts: 5
 Reference:

Event 4: $ 500 Limit Seven Card Stud

 Number of buy-ins: 152
 Total prize pool: $76,000
 Number of payouts: 10
 Reference:

Event 5: $ 200 Pot Limit Omaha

 Number of buy-ins: 607
 Total prize pool: $121,400
 Number of payouts: 10
 Reference:

Event 6: $ 1,000 Limit Seven Card Stud Hi/Lo

 Number of buy-ins: Unknown
 Total prize pool: $55,800
 Number of payouts: 10
 Reference:

Event 7: $ 200 No Limit Hold'em

 Number of buy-ins: Unknown
 Total prize pool: $161,400
 Number of payouts: 9
 Reference:

Event 8: $ 500 Limit Hold'em

 Number of buy-ins: 161
 Total prize pool: $80,500
 Number of payouts: 9
 Reference:

Event 9: $ 1,000 Limit Seven Card Stud

 Number of buy-ins: Unknown
 Total prize pool: $58,000
 Number of payouts: 1
 Reference:

Event 10: $ 2,500 No Limit 2-7 Draw

 Number of buy-ins: Unknown
 Total prize pool: $71,250
 Number of payouts: 1
 Reference:

Event 11: $ 200 Pot Limit Omaha

 Number of buy-ins: Unknown
 Total prize pool: $60,975
 Number of payouts: 1
 Reference:

Event 12:$ 1,000 No Limit Hold'em

 Number of buy-ins: 135
 Total prize pool: $135,000
 Number of payouts: 9
 Reference:

References

Super Bowl of Poker
1988 in poker